Gaekwar's Baroda State Railway (GBSR) or Gaikwad Baroda State Railway was a narrow gauge railway line owned by the Princely State of Baroda, which was ruled by the Gaekwar dynasty.

History

The railway track has the distinction of being the first narrow-gauge line to be laid in British India, and also the first railway to be owned by any Princely State of India. In 1862, Maharaja Khanderao Gaekwad, the Maharaja of Baroda, inaugurated  of a  railway line from Dabhoi to Miyagam. Oxen were used to haul the train, although in 1863, Nielson & Co. built a locomotive to be operated on the line from Dabhoi to Miyagram, as the 6.5 km/m rails were not suited for the regular use of an engine.

Later, during the rule of Maharaja Sayajirao Gaekwad III, the railway's network was further expanded. In 1873, the Dabhoi-Miyagam line (the first  line) was re-laid with stronger rails to allow locomotives to be used, rather than oxen. However, locomotives were not regularly used on the line until 1880. During the Maharaja's reign, railway network extended to Goyagate, Chandod, Bodeli and Samalaya Jn with Dabhoi as its focal point.

In 1949, the GBSR was merged with the Bombay, Baroda and Central India Railway which was subsequently merged in 1951 with other adjacent zones to form Western Railway.

The narrow-gauge line is currently under conversion to broad gauge.

Rolling stock 
In 1936, the company owned 66 locomotives, 3 railcars, 483 coaches and 1674 goods wagons.

Classification
It was labeled as a Class II railway according to Indian Railway Classification System of 1926.

See also
 List of railway companies in India

References

Further reading 

Transport in Vadodara
2 ft 6 in gauge railways in India
Metre gauge railways in India
Defunct railway companies of India
History of Vadodara
Baroda State
History of rail transport in Gujarat